Domenico Viola (c.1610-1620 - 1696) was an Italian painter and draughtsman, who was born and died in Naples. His pupils included Francesco de Mura, whilst his contemporaries in the Accademia di San Luca included Michelangelo Cerquozzi.

Artworks by him are in several North American and European art galleries and museums, such as the Smithsonian American Art Museum. and four works by him have been auctioned between 2005 and 2019 (Saint Peter Denies Christ (2004), Nine Men's Morris Players in a Tavern, The Card Players and The Martyrdom of Saint Lawrence)

References

Italian Baroque painters
1696 deaths
1610s births
People from Naples
17th-century Italian painters